"I've Never Loved Anyone More" is a song written by Linda Hargrove and Michael Nesmith. It was recorded by American country music artist Lynn Anderson and released as a single in June 1975 via Columbia Records.

Background and release
"I've Never Loved Anyone More" was recorded at the Columbia Studio, located in Nashville, Tennessee. The sessions was produced by Glenn Sutton, Anderson's longtime production collaborator at the label and her first husband.

"I've Never Loved Anyone More" reached number 14 on the Billboard Hot Country Singles chart in 1975. It became an even bigger hit on the Canadian RPM Country Songs chart, reaching number 4 the same year. The song was issued on Anderson's 1975 studio album, I've Never Loved Anyone More.

Track listings 
7" vinyl single
 "I've Never Loved Anymore More" – 2:42
 "He Worshiped Me" – 2:39

Chart performance

References

1975 singles
1975 songs
Columbia Records singles
Lynn Anderson songs
Songs written by Linda Hargrove
Songs written by Michael Nesmith
Song recordings produced by Glenn Sutton